Black Range State Park is a state park  northwest of Melbourne, Australia, near the town of Cavendish.
In addition to natural flora and fauna, the park protects Australian Aboriginal art and occupation sites of the Jardwadjali people. The area's steep, rocky terrain meant it was never cleared by pastoralists, and has essentially remained in its natural condition.

References

State parks of Victoria (Australia)